Kibirizi is an administrative ward in Kigoma-Ujiji District of Kigoma Region in Tanzania. 
In 2016 the Tanzania National Bureau of Statistics report there were 27,675 people in the ward, from 25,143 in 2012.

Villages / neighborhoods 
The ward has 11 neighborhoods.

 Buronge
 Bushabani
 Butunga
 Kahabwa
 Katandala
 Kibirizi B
 Kibirizii A
 Kichwele
 Mgombewa
 Mtolele
 Rasini

References

Wards of Kigoma Region